The 1996 DFB-Supercup, known as the Panasonic DFB-Supercup for sponsorship purposes, was the tenth DFB-Supercup, an annual football match contested by the winners of the previous season's Bundesliga and DFB-Pokal competitions. It was the last DFB-Supercup, with the competition replaced by a DFB-Ligapokal which ran from 1997 to 2007. The supercup returned in 2010, now run by the Deutsche Fußball Liga (DFL).

The match was played at the Carl-Benz-Stadion, Mannheim, and contested by league champions Borussia Dortmund and cup winners 1. FC Kaiserslautern. Dortmund won their second consecutive title, their third in total.

Teams

Match

Details

See also
 1995–96 Bundesliga
 1995–96 DFB-Pokal

References

1996
Borussia Dortmund matches
1. FC Kaiserslautern matches
1996–97 in German football cups
Dfl-Supercup 1996